The 2017 United Women's Lacrosse League season, the second in the history of the UWLX, starts on May 27, 2017 and ends with the league championship game on August 2, 2017.

Offseason

2017 UWLX Draft results

 - indicates a returning player

Baltimore Ride

Boston Storm

Long Island Sound

Philly Force

Regular season

League standings

Schedule

See also
 2017 in sports

References

External links

United Women's Lacrosse League